Cái Răng is an urban district of Cần Thơ in the Mekong Delta region of Vietnam. As of 2003 the district had a population of 77,292. This increased to 82,152 in 2007. The district covers an area of 63 km². Cái Răng district was established by Decree No. 05/2004/ND-CP on January 2, 2004. The district borders Vĩnh Long province to the east, Phong Điền district to the west, Hậu Giang province to the south and Ninh Kieu district to the northwest.

Cái Răng is growing in population and construction as a result of Cần Thơ expanding southward and Cái Răng including much of southern Cần Thơ.

Administrative divisions
Cái Răng district is divided into wards (Phường):

Lê Bình
Thường Thạnh
Phú Thứ 
Tân Phú
Ba Láng
Hưng Phú 
Hưng Thạnh

References

Districts of Cần Thơ